Doto wildei is a species of sea slug, a nudibranch, a marine gastropod mollusc in the family Dotidae.

Distribution
Distribution of Doto wildei includes Curaçao and Panama (but the identification of this species in Panama is uncertain, because it lacks pseudogills on the cerata).

Description 
Body is narrow and elongate. Rhinophores are smooth with tight rhinophoral sheaths. Cerata are with rounded tubercles; apical tubercles are much larger than the rest. Cerata are spaced out along the dorsum. Background color is translucent gray with a series of opaque white spots on the dorsum. Cerata are with cream or white extensions of the digestive gland. The body size is up to 4 mm.

Ecology 
It was found on hydroids in Panama.

References
This article incorporates Creative Commons (CC-BY-4.0) text from the reference

External links

Dotidae
Gastropods described in 1970
Taxa named by Eveline Du Bois-Reymond Marcus
Taxa named by Ernst Marcus (zoologist)